Abaokoro is a settlement in Kiribati.  It is located about nine nautical miles from Tarawa. It is located in the Tarawa Atoll.

Abaokoro Post Office opened on 13 December 1956.

References

Populated places in Kiribati